The Senior League World Series West Region is one of six United States regions that currently sends teams to the World Series in Easley, South Carolina. The region's participation in the SLWS dates back to 1962.

West Region States

 Northern California
 Southern California

Region Champions
As of the 2022 Senior League World Series.

Results by State
As of the 2022 Senior League World Series.

See also
West Region in other Little League divisions
Little League – West 1957-2000
Little League – Northwest
Little League – West
Intermediate League
Junior League
Big League

References

Senior League World Series
West
Baseball competitions in the United States